Salam Rud (also Romanized as Salam Rūd and Salm Rūd) is a village in Kharturan Rural District, Beyarjomand District, Shahrud County, Semnan Province, Iran. At the 2006 census, its population was 38, in 7 families.

References 

Populated places in Shahrud County